Eunoe opalina is a scale worm widely distributed in the Southern Ocean at depths of about 200–1400m.

Description
Number of segments 38; elytra 15 pairs. No distinct pigmentation pattern. Prostomium anterior margin comprising a pair of acute anterior projections. Lateral antennae inserted ventrally (beneath Prostomium and median antenna). Notochaetae thinner than neurochaetae. Bidentate neurochaetae absent.

Commensalism
E. oplina is commensal. Its host taxon is a sea cucumber: Bathyplotes bongraini.

References

Phyllodocida
Animals described in 1885